Wind Across the Everglades is a 1958 film directed by Nicholas Ray. Ray was fired from the film before production was finished, and several scenes were completed by screenwriter Budd Schulberg, who also supervised the editing. Chris Fujiwara wrote on Turner Classic Movies that the film is "an acid test for auteurists, one of those special films that, while ignored or despised for the most part, are cherished and fiercely defended by those who love great American directors."

The film stars Burl Ives, features Christopher Plummer in his first lead role (and his second film role overall) and introduces Chana Eden, who plays the leading lady, and Peter Falk, who plays a minor role. Former stripper Gypsy Rose Lee and circus clown Emmett Kelly also are among those in an unusual cast.

It was filmed on location in Everglades National Park in Technicolor.

Plot
Set in the early 20th century, the film follows a game warden who arrives in Florida in the hopes of enforcing conservation laws. He soon finds himself pitted against Cottonmouth, the leader of a fierce group of bird poachers. The film is loosely based upon the life and death of Guy Bradley, an early game warden who in 1905 was shot and killed by plume hunters in the Everglades.

Cast
 Burl Ives as Cottonmouth
 Christopher Plummer as Walt Murdock
 Gypsy Rose Lee as Mrs. Bradford
 George Voskovec as Aaron Nathanson
 Tony Galento as Beef
 Howard I. Smith as George Liggett
 Emmett Kelly as Bigamy Bob
 Pat Henning as Sawdust
 Chana Eden as Naomi Nathanson
 Curt Conway as Perfessor
 Peter Falk as Writer
 Fred Grossinger as Slowboy
 Sammy Renick as Loser
 Toch Brown as One-note
 Frank Rothe as Howard Ross Morgan
 MacKinlay Kantor as Judge Harris
 Cory Osceola as Billy One-Arm

Critical reputation
Due to Ray's having been fired from the production before the film was completed, Wind Across the Everglades holds a contentious place in film scholarship. In a short review of the film, critic Jonathan Rosenbaum described it as "a kind of litmus test for auteurists". After citing the film's editorial history, Rosenbaum goes on to say that "Ray's masterful use of color and mystical sense of equality between the antagonists (also evident in Rebel Without a Cause and Bitter Victory) are made all the more piquant here by his feeling for folklore and outlaw ethics as well as his cadenced mise en scene." While it was praised for its ahead-of-its-time ecological themes and authentic and unusual scenery, the film still suffered from "editorial hacking and post-production cheapness" leading to an overall effect of "one of those production disasters that bleeds brilliance in all directions."

See also
 List of American films of 1958

References

External links
 
 
 
 

1958 films
1958 drama films
American drama films
1950s English-language films
Films directed by Nicholas Ray
Films set in Florida
Films set in the 1900s
Films shot in Florida
Films about hunters
Films scored by Paul Sawtell
Films with screenplays by Budd Schulberg
Warner Bros. films
1950s American films
Everglades